William Edward Murphy was a politician in Queensland, Australia. He was a Member of the Queensland Legislative Assembly, the first representative for the seat of Cook. He held this seat from 1 June 1876 to 5 December 1878.

Personal life 
He was born in 1833 (Sydney, New South Wales, Australia) and died in 1881 (Pyrmont, New South Wales, Australia). Before entering Parliament he was a solicitor in Brisbane. His religion was Roman Catholic.

References 

Members of the Queensland Legislative Assembly
1833 births
1881 deaths
19th-century Australian politicians